Hämmerle is a German surname. Notable people with the surname include:

Alessandro Hämmerle (born 1993), Swiss-born Austrian snowboarder
Alfred Hämmerle, Austrian sports shooter
Elisa Hämmerle (born 1995), Austrian artistic gymnast

German-language surnames